Aleksander Albert Krajewski (1818-1903) was a Polish publicist and translator. For activity in Polish nationalist organizations sentenced to katorga by Russian Empire in 1838; returned after the amnesty of 1858. His translations include Goethe's Faust, works of Roman poet Horace and British poet George Gordon Byron.

1818 births
1903 deaths
Polish nationalists